BUL Armory is an Israeli firearms manufacturer of CZ 75, M1911, and AR15 clones designed for defensive carry, duty carry, and practical shooting sports.

History
BUL was founded in 1990. It initially produced only a variant of the 1911 pistol (the BUL M-5). Later it began producing the BUL Storm and  BUL Cherokee series of pistols, both CZ 75 variants. The Storm and Cherokee are chambered only in the 9mm Parabellum while the M-5 is chambered then 9mm Parabellum, 9x21, 9x23, .38 Super, .40 S&W, and .45 ACP. The Spike is a 9mm caliber pistol equipped with Bul's handgun red-dot sight MS-3.

Models
 BUL 1911 Government
 BUL 1911 Commander
 BUL 1911 Trophy
 BUL 1911 Hunter 6
 BUL M-5
 BUL Cherokee
 BUL Storm
 BUL Classic G1911
 BUL Classic C1911
 BUL Classic U1911
 BUL SAS
BUL SAS II
BUL Axe

See also
Israel Weapon Industries

References

External links
 
 2011 Catalog 
 2017 Catalog 
  2020 Catalog 

Bul Transmark